Enantia limnorina is a butterfly in the  family Pieridae. It is found in Brazil (Santa Catarina, Rio Grande do Sul, Rio de Janeiro). The species was first described in 1865 by C. & R. Felder as Leptalis limnorina.

References

Dismorphiinae
Butterflies described in 1865
Fauna of Brazil
Pieridae of South America
Taxa named by Baron Cajetan von Felder
Taxa named by Rudolf Felder